On Fire: A Teen Wolf Novel is a novel written by Nancy Holder. It is set in urban Beacon Hills.

Plot
Sixteen-year-old Scott McCall is looking for half of what's left of a murdered woman, with his best friend Stiles. While after being left alone in the woods, he was bitten by an alpha werewolf.

Characters
Scott McCall is the sixteen-year-old protagonist. Raised by his single mother, Melissa McCall a nurse at the local hospital. He was a normal kid that grew up in a broken home. Until one day before the school year started he was bitten by an Alpha werewolf. Now he is forced to hide his other side from his mother.
Stiles Stilinski is the son of the local sheriff, and Scott's best friend.
Allison Argent is the daughter of werewolves hunters, and Scott's love interest
Derek Hale is a mysterious werewolf who helps Scott to control his powers
Lydia Martin is a popular girl from Scott's high school, who quickly becomes friends with Allyson. She's very smart, she's fine in school, her boyfriend is Jackson Whittermore and she's Stiles' crush.

References

2012 American novels
Teen Wolf (2011 TV series)